The 1901 Iowa gubernatorial election was held on November 5, 1901. Republican nominee Albert B. Cummins defeated Democratic nominee T. J. Phillips with 58.09% of the vote.

General election

Candidates
Major party candidates
Albert B. Cummins, Republican
T. J. Phillips, Democratic 

Other candidates
A. U. Coates, Prohibition
James Baxter, Socialist
Luman Hamlin Weller, People's

Results

References

1901
Iowa